National American University (NAU) is a private for-profit online university with an additional location at Ellsworth Air Force Base. It is owned by National American University Holdings, Inc. (NAUH). In 2018, NAU acquired the assets of Henley-Putnam University and now offers strategic security programs. Most of NAU's academic programs are on the 11-week quarter system and have monthly starts. The school is accredited by the Higher Learning Commission.

History

Originally called "National School of Business" in 1941, National American University changed its name to National College of Business, then National College, before adopting its current name.

In 1996 National American University began developing online courses and degree options for students across the United States and internationally. Online programs include associate's, bachelor's and master's degrees in accounting, business, information technology, strategic security, and health care. Students are also provided access to classes and extensive campus resources including learning resource center services, tutoring services, counseling services, and computer support through a student portal.

In 2012, 53% of NAU's students were studying online, with an additional 17% taking some classes online. In 2018, 77% of NAU's students were studying online, with an additional 12% taking some classes online.

Financial issues and retrenchment
In 2018, NAUH mortgaged real property to secure an $8 million loan which was subsequently paid in full. Campus closings were planned as NAU transitioned to an online university  and the NAUH agreed to voluntarily delist from the NASDAQ.

The following year, NAUH announced that "the Company had $0.5 million of unrestricted cash and cash equivalents and a working capital deficiency of $8.7 million. These factors, among others, raise substantial doubt regarding the Company’s ability to continue as a going concern." On February 15, 2019, NAUH announced Thomas Bickart as their new Chief Financial Officer. Bickart was CFO at TCI College of Technology from 2013 to 2016 and later worked at EdisonLearning, Inc. to restructure its operations. In March, the university announced that most of its 24 ground campuses would be closed, except for Ellsworth Air Force Base and King's Bay Naval Submarine Base.

On April 15, 2019, National American University reported that they must post a letter of credit for either 50% ($36.7 million) or 15% ($11 million) of its Title IV awards to continue participating in the program. It faced further pressure with an $800,000 debt payment due the following month and an ongoing federal False Claims lawsuit. NAU's students were surprised that the campuses were closing.

National American University received $1,453,446	under the first round of the 2020 CARES Act, $390,269 under the second round of the Covid Relief Bill, and $207,146 under the 2021 American Rescue Plan.

In October 2021, Minnesota Office Plaza filed a lawsuit against NAUH, claiming that NAUH hid assets to avoid paying $2.3 million in back and future rent.

In January 2022, NAUH reported $8.2 million in assets, $15.9 million in liabilities, and less than $400,000 in cash. The school is currently on Heightened Cash Monitoring by the US Department of Education. A class action lawsuit by 43 former students is also pending. In April 2022, NAUH reported less than $50,000 in cash.

Academics

Programs
National American University is organized into four academic divisions:
 College of Undergraduate Studies
 Henley-Putnam School of Strategic Security
 Harold D. Buckingham Graduate School
 College of Legal Studies
National American University offers Bachelor of Science degrees, Associate of Applied Science degrees, and diplomas in accounting, management, business administration, allied health, criminal justice, healthcare management, health and beauty management, and information technology. In August 2008, NAU's graduate studies program was renamed the Harold D. Buckingham Graduate School, in honor of the late owner. Graduate degree programs include an M.B.A., a Master of Management degree, a Doctor of Education (EdD), and Master and Doctoral degrees in Strategic Security, Terrorism and Counterterrorism Studies, and Intelligence Management.

Faculty
According to the College Navigator, National American University has 1 full-time instructor and 249 part-time instructors.

Enrollment
Total student enrollment has declined from 9,519 students in 2015 to 3,398 students in February 2019. In March 2019, National American University announced that it was closing most of its remaining 24 physical locations, including campuses in Rapid City  and Sioux Falls. and is now an online university. The College Navigator reports NAU's total enrollment at 1,610 students.

Student outcomes
According to the College Scorecard, NAU's Rapid City campus has a 16 percent graduation rate. Salary after completing ranges from $25,484 (AA in health and administrative medical services) to $56,163 (BSN). Two years after completion, student loan debt borrowers were 31% in forbearance, 26% not making progress, 17% defaulted, 9% in deferment, 8% delinquent, 5% making progress, 2% discharged, and 1% paid in full.

Accreditation
NAU is regionally accredited by the Higher Learning Commission. Several NAU programs are separately accredited by multiple national, educational and professional associations.

Locations

Remaining locations
Online (1,440 students) 
*Georgia
Kings Bay Naval Base (40 students) 
*South Dakota
Ellsworth Air Force Base (118 students)

Closed campuses

Colorado
Centennial (Denver Metro)
Colorado Springs (North)
Colorado Springs (South)
Indiana
Indianapolis
Kansas
Garden City
Overland Park
Wichita (East)
Wichita (West)
Minnesota
Bloomington
Brooklyn Center
Burnsville
Rochester
Roseville
Missouri
Independence
Lee's Summit
Zona Rosa (Kansas City)
Nebraska
Bellevue
New Mexico
Albuquerque (East)
Albuquerque (West)
Oklahoma
Tulsa
South Carolina
Charleston (Joint Base Charleston)
South Dakota
Rapid City
Sioux Falls
Watertown
Texas 
Austin 
Georgetown
Houston
Killeen
Lewisville
Mesquite
Richardson

National American University Holdings, Inc.
National American University Holdings, Inc., was a publicly traded corporation (NASDAQ: NAUH) holding company for NAU and other assets. The corporation is located in Rapid City, South Dakota. National American University Holdings, Inc. is now an "Over The Counter" traded company listed on the OTCQB since January 2019.

References

External links

For-profit universities and colleges in the United States
Private universities and colleges in Colorado
Universities and colleges in Denver
Education in Colorado Springs, Colorado
Private universities and colleges in New Mexico
Education in Albuquerque, New Mexico
Rio Rancho, New Mexico
Private universities and colleges in Minnesota
Universities and colleges in Bloomington, Minnesota
Universities and colleges in Hennepin County, Minnesota
Universities and colleges in Ramsey County, Minnesota
Private universities and colleges in Kansas
Educational institutions established in 1941
Education in Wichita, Kansas
Private universities and colleges in South Dakota
Education in Rapid City, South Dakota
Education in Sioux Falls, South Dakota
Education in Meade County, South Dakota
Education in Codington County, South Dakota
Private universities and colleges in Texas
Universities and colleges in Austin, Texas
Education in Overland Park, Kansas
Education in Sandoval County, New Mexico
Education in St. Charles County, Missouri
Private universities and colleges in Missouri
1941 establishments in the United States